The Jameh Mosque of Kermanshah, also called the Chehel Sotoun mosque, is located in the old City of Kermanshah, on Modarres Street, to Rashid Yasemi Street.

References

Mosques in Iran
Mosque buildings with domes
National works of Iran
Kermanshah